Chris Ward may refer to:

Chris Ward (American football) (born 1956), former NFL player
Chris Ward (California politician) (born 1976), member of the San Diego City Council
Chris Ward (baseball) (born 1949), American baseball player
Chris Ward (bowls) (born 1941), England lawn bowler
Chris Ward (Canadian politician) (born 1949), former politician in Ontario, Canada
Chris Ward (chess player) (born 1968), English chess grandmaster
Chris Ward (footballer) (born 1981), former Lincoln City player
Chris Ward (playwright) (born 1958), English/Canadian playwright
Chris Ward (sailor), New Zealand sailor
Chris Ward (singer) (born 1960), American country music artist
Chris Ward (sound editor) (born 1970)
Chris Ward (surfer) (born 1978), American surfer
Chris Ward, American rapper and television performer, better known as MC Chris

See also
Christopher Ward (disambiguation)